The Leaders Party of Vanuatu (LPV) is a political party in Vanuatu.

History
The party was formed in 2015 by Jotham Napat, a former director general of the Ministry of Infrastructure and Public Utilities. In the 2016 elections the party fielded five candidates, winning one seat; Napat in Tanna. The party won four additional seats in the 2020 elections. Un the 2022 snap election the party retained its five seats and joined Ishmael Kalsakau government coalition.

Election results

Parliament

References

External links
Facebook page

Political parties in Vanuatu
2015 establishments in Vanuatu
Political parties established in 2015